The following radio stations broadcast on AM frequency 1692 kHz:

In Australia 
 Radio Rhythm in Perth, Western Australia.
 Radio Symban in Campbeltown, New South Wales.

References

Lists of radio stations by frequency